Obscurin is a protein that in humans is encoded by the OBSCN gene. Obscurin belongs to the family of giant sarcomeric signaling proteins that includes titin and nebulin. Obscurin is expressed in cardiac and skeletal muscle, and plays a role in the organization of myofibrils during sarcomere assembly. A mutation in the OBSCN gene has been associated with hypertrophic cardiomyopathy and altered obscurin protein properties have been associated with other muscle diseases.

Structure
Human obscurin may exist as multiple splice variants of approximately 720 kDa, however the full-length nature of only one has been described to date. Obscurin is expressed in cardiac and skeletal muscle. The obscurin gene spans more than 150 kb, contains over 80 exons. The encoded protein contains 68 Ig domains, 2 fibronectin domains, 1 calcium/calmodulin-binding domain, 1 RhoGEF domain with an associated PH domain, and 2 serine-threonine kinase domains. The dominant location of obscurin in mature myofibrils is at the sarcomeric M-band. Titin, obscurin, obscurin-like-1 and myomesin form a ternary complex at sarcomeric M-bands that is critical for sarcomere mechanics.

Function 
Obscurin belongs to the family of giant sarcomeric signaling proteins that includes titin and nebulin, and may have a role in the organization of myofibrils during assembly and may mediate interactions between the sarcoplasmic reticulum and myofibrils. Obscurin is the major cytoplasmic ligand for small ankyrin 1 (sANK1), a sarcoplasmic reticular protein, and the scaffolding function of obscurin appears to prevent degradation of sANK1. These data indicate that obscurin serves as a signaling link between the sarcomeric and sarcoplasmic reticular domains, Obscurin plays a role in the formation of new sarcomeres during myofibril assembly. specifically, at the sarcomeric periphery where sites of initiation and progression of myofibrilogenesis lie. Obscurin appears to be necessary for the proper incorporation of myosin filaments into sarcomeres and in the assembly of A-bands. Moreover, the kinase domains of obscurin are enzymatically active and appear to be involved in the regulation of cell adhesion.

Clinical significance
Obscurin has been shown to exhibit a disease-related isoform switch in patients with dilated cardiomyopathy. An obscurin mutation Arg4344Gln was identified in patients with hypertrophic cardiomyopathy, which disrupted binding of obscurin to the Z9-Z10 domains of titin. A later study, however, was not able to reproduce this effect. Due to lack of mechanistic evidence and the high prevalence among African Americans, the Arg4344Gln variant is currently not considered to be pathogenic. Mutations found the gene encoding titin in patients with limb-girdle muscular dystrophy 2J or Salih myopathy decrease the ability of titin to bind obscurin, suggesting that this may be causative in disease manifestation.

Interactions 

Obscurin has been shown to interact with Titin, specifically, with the Novex-3 of Titin, a 6.5 kb exon located upstream of the cardiac-specific N2B exon. The C-terminal region of Obscurin interacts with the cytoplasmic domain of small ankyrin 1 and with the exon 43' region of ankyrin B.  The Ig3 of obscurin binds myomesin at the linker between My4 and My5.

References

Further reading 

 
 
 
 
 
 
 
 
 
 
 
 
 
 

EC 2.7.11